Katharine Sergava (July 30, 1910 in Tbilisi, Georgia – November 26, 2005. Married name: Katharine Sergava Sznycer) was an actress and dancer.

She was best known for portraying both Ellen and the dream-ballet version of Laurey, the heroine, in the premiere of Oklahoma!. She later performed in ''Look Ma, I'm Dancing,'' choreographed by Jerome Robbins.  She had also appeared in several films and TV shows.

In 2003 she was erroneously reported dead in The Daily Telegraph and The New York Times.

She lived in retirement in Greenwich Village, New York City. She was a teacher of the Stanislavski's system at Herbert Berghof Studio (HB Studio) in Bank Street Greenwich Village.

Sznycer died on Saturday, November 26, 2005, in New York City from natural causes in her apartment home, after an extended stay in a nursing facility. She was 95.

References

External links

1910 births
2005 deaths
Emigrants from the Russian Empire to the United States
20th-century American male actors